Arhopalus is a genus of beetles in the family Cerambycidae, the longhorn beetles, in the tribe Asemini.

Species
BioLib lists:
 Arhopalus asperatus (LeConte, 1859)
 Arhopalus biarcuatus Pu, 1981
 Arhopalus brunneus (Gardner, 1942)
 Arhopalus cavatus Pu, 1981
 Arhopalus coreanus (Sharp, 1905)
 Arhopalus cubensis (Mutchler, 1914)
 Arhopalus deceptor (Sharp, 1905)
 Arhopalus exoticus (Sharp, 1905)
 Arhopalus ferus (Mulsant, 1839)
 Arhopalus foveatus Chiang, 1963
 Arhopalus foveicollis (Haldeman, 1847)
 Arhopalus hispaniolae (Fisher, 1942)
 †Arhopalus pavitus (Cockerell, 1927)
 Arhopalus pinetorum (Wollaston, 1863)
 Arhopalus productus (LeConte, 1850)
 Arhopalus rusticus (Linnaeus, 1758)
 Arhopalus syriacus (Reitter, 1895)
 Arhopalus tibetanus (Sharp, 1905)
 Arhopalus tobirensis Hayashi, 1968

External links

 Arhopalus in Fauna Europaea

Spondylidinae
Cerambycidae genera